Biomphalaria angulosa is a species of air-breathing freshwater snail, an aquatic pulmonate gastropod mollusk in the family Planorbidae, the ram's horn snails.

This species is found in Malawi, Tanzania, and Zambia.

References

Biomphalaria
Gastropods described in 1957
Taxonomy articles created by Polbot